George Elliott (born July 3, 1932) is a former American football player and coach. He served as the head football coach at Northeastern State University in Tahlequah, Oklahoma from 1975 to 1986, compiling a record of 85–35–3.

Elliott played one season in 1955 for the Winnipeg Blue Bombers of the Canadian Football League.

Head coaching record

College

References

1932 births
Living people
American football halfbacks
American football quarterbacks
American players of Canadian football
Northeastern State RiverHawks football coaches
Northeastern State RiverHawks football players
Oklahoma Sooners football players
Winnipeg Blue Bombers players
High school football coaches in Oklahoma
People from Muskogee, Oklahoma
Coaches of American football from Oklahoma
Players of American football from Oklahoma